Butler Morris (born  in Madang, Papua New Guinea) is a Papua New Guinean professional rugby union and rugby league footballer who has played in the 2010s. He has played representative rugby union (RU) for Papua New Guinea (Pukpuks) and the Papua New Guinea rugby sevens, as flanker, and club level rugby league (RL) for the Papua New Guinea Hunters in the Queensland Intrust Super Cup.

References

1994 births
Living people
Male rugby sevens players
Papua New Guinea Hunters players
Papua New Guinean rugby league players
Papua New Guinean rugby union players
Place of birth missing (living people)
Rugby articles needing expert attention